Peter "Bruce" Bennetts (born 25 March 1967) is an Australian visual artist specialising in Architectural Photography.

Biography 
Born in Sydney, Bennetts spent his childhood in Perth before moving to Melbourne in 1984 to study photography at RMIT University. After graduating, he worked within environmental reporting, contributing images to Lonely Planet and in conjunction with Tony Wheeler co-authored the book, Time & Tide: The Islands of Tuvalu.

During his photographic career Peter Bennetts has photographed projects by international architecture firms including but not limited to; Casa da Música by Office of Metropolitan Architecture, MAXXI – National Museum of the 21st Century Arts by Zaha Hadid Architects, Barcelona Pavilion by Mies van der Rohe and Torre Agbar by Jean Nouvel. Additionally, Bennetts has also worked with architecture firms based in his home country Australia, including; Melbourne Rectangular Stadium by COX Architects & Planners, Jane Foss Russell Building by John Wardle and the Australian Centre for Contemporary Art (ACCA) by Wood Marsh.

Peter Bennetts presented a solo exhibition in 2008 titled, Recent Architecture Photography, featuring images including portraits of Bill Henson, Jean Nouvel, Peter Cook and Greg Lynn, alongside his commercial architectural work and environmental reporting of Tuvalu.

In 2005 Peter Bennetts co-founded the Falls Creek, Victoria Artist's Camp with David Hugh Thomas, an annual event that brings contemporary artists together in Falls Creek, Victoria.

Publications

Magazines 
Peter Bennetts has contributed in magazines including Wallpaper (magazine), Frame (magazine), Mark (magazine), Dwell (magazine), Domus (magazine), Casabella, Architectural Review, Architecture Australia and Artichoke.

Co-authored 
 (2001) Time & Tide, The Islands of Tuvalu

Contributor 
 (2004) New Conversations with an Old Landscape: Landscape Architecture in Contemporary Australia
 (2004) The Phaidon Atlas of World Architecture
 (2005) The Travel Book: A Journey Through Every Country in the World
 (2008) Phaidon Atlas of 21st Century World Architecture
 (2009) Lonely Planet The Cities Book
 (2010) Lonely Planet The Travel Book

Exhibitions

Solo 
 (2008) Recent Architecture Photography

Contributor 
 (2007) The Trouble with the Weather: A Southern Response

Equipment 
Peter Bennetts utilises an Alpa camera with Rodenstock GmbH and Schneider Kreuznach lenses paired with a Leaf (Israeli company) Aptus II 10 medium format digital camera back.

Awards 
 (2004) ASLA Professional Awards, Communications Award of Merit

References

External links 
 Peter Bennetts Website
 Dwell, The Melbourne Supremacy, Interview with Peter Bennetts
 42 Days Interning for Architectural Photographer Peter Bennetts

1967 births
Living people
Artists from Sydney
RMIT University alumni